Arthur Szwarc (born 30 March 1995) is a Canadian professional volleyball player. He is a member of the Canada national team, and was a participant in the Olympic Games Tokyo 2020. At the professional club level, he plays for Vero Volley Monza.

Personal life
Szwarc is of Polish descent.

References

External links
 
 
 Player profile at Volleybox.net
 York Lions 2015–16 Roster – Arthur Szwarc

1995 births
Living people
Canadian people of Polish descent
Volleyball players from Toronto
Canadian men's volleyball players
Olympic volleyball players of Canada
Volleyball players at the 2020 Summer Olympics
Canadian expatriate sportspeople in France
Expatriate volleyball players in France
Canadian expatriate sportspeople in Italy
Expatriate volleyball players in Italy
Middle blockers
Opposite hitters